Gustav Hermann William August Koenigs (21 December 1882 – 15 April 1945) was a German lawyer and State Secretary of Transport during the Weimar period and the Third Reich. The conspirators of the 20 July plot planned for him to become Reich Transport Minister had the coup d'état succeeded.

Early life and education
Gustav Koenigs was born in Düsseldorf. When his father became an official in the Prussian Ministry of Trade and Industry, the family moved to Berlin and Gustav attended school in the district of Schöneberg. Koenigs followed in his father's footsteps, studying law in Freiburg im Breisgau, Bonn and finally back in Berlin. After completing his clerkship in 1909, he worked in various positions in District of Blumenthal, his hometown of Düsseldorf, and in Nauen. In 1920 he was appointed Undersecretary at the Department of Waterways in the Reich Ministry of Transport. He was promoted and became head of the Department for Inland and Maritime transport on 1 April 1921.

On 30 December 1931 he was appointed State Secretary in the Reich Ministry of Transport. At that time it was led by Theodor von Guérard. He retained his position under Guérard's successors, Gottfried Treviranus and Paul Freiherr von Eltz-Rübenach.

Notes

References

External links
 
 

Jurists from Baden-Württemberg
1882 births
1945 deaths
People from Düsseldorf
German civilians killed in World War II
Deaths by airstrike during World War II